Turtle Creek is a Canadian creek in Albert County, southeastern New Brunswick.

Turtle Creek is one of the Petitcodiac River's main right tributaries, and is therefore part of its  drainage basin. Its watershed has been designated as a Provincial Watershed Protected Area, making certain activities off-limits within  of the reservoir.

The reservoir was the subject of a major upgrade completed in 2012 which doubled its existing water storage capacity. It has also been the centre of controversies regarding the province's push to begin uranium exploration and gas and oil tests in the area, in spite of the boundaries set on the surroundings.

Watershed

Approximately 75% of the land is forested, with about 10% used for residential purposes. The Turtle Creek reservoir is designated as a Provincial Watershed Protected Area, making certain activities illegal within  of the area.

Water quality

Covered under the Watershed Protected Area Designation Order and Clean Water Act, Turtle Creek is rated, among thirty others, as a Class AP watershed. In spite of this rating, E. coli and sediment levels were found to be "unusually high", which, according to the Petitcodiac Watershed Alliance, was caused by the ongoing expansion of the river's reservoir. Nitrate, phosphate, and conductivity levels, according to the same report, remained consistent.

The city of Moncton conducts studies on over 1,600 water samples in 60 sites yearly to assure water drinking quality standards are met. According to an annual report published by the city in 2009, coliform bacteria, which includes E. coli, was not found in any of 1,663 samples. In the same report, 63 of 576 (10.94%) water samples returned a Heterotropic Plate Count—the "general bacteria population" present—of over 10 cfu/mL, but never exceeded the 500 cfu/mL threshold. Other results recorded an average turbidity of 0.15 NTU (Nephelometric Turbidity Units), and an average of 0.029 mg/L of trihalomethanes (THMs).

Reservoir

See also
List of rivers of New Brunswick

References

Landforms of Albert County, New Brunswick
Rivers of New Brunswick